Ha-111 may refer to:

 , an Imperial Japanese Navy submarine in commission from July to September 1945
 Mitsubishi Ha111, an alternative name for the Mitsubishi Kasei aircraft engine